On May 7, 2019, a school shooting occurred at STEM School Highlands Ranch, a charter school located in Douglas County, Colorado, United States, in the Denver suburb of Highlands Ranch. One student was killed and eight others were injured. Two teenagers, students Alec McKinney and Devon Erickson, were convicted on dozens of charges and sentenced to life imprisonment.

Background
The K-12 charter school held approximately 1,850 students. At the time of the shooting, it had no police officer assigned to it and used private security instead.

In December 2018, an anonymous parent reportedly called the Douglas County School Board of Education's director to express concerns about the school, specifically about bullying and violence. A district official wrote a letter on December 19, 2018, urging the School Executive Director to investigate concerns to determine their legitimacy and to take any remedial action that may be appropriate. The school has since filed a defamation lawsuit against the parent who had raised allegations that the school was a pressure cooker for violence or a school shooting.

On April 29, 2019, the Wikipedia entry for the STEM School Highlands Ranch featured the sentence: "Anti suicide programs are implemented [in the school] to help lower chances of suicide and school shootings." The following comment was added by an anonymous editor that day: "Do they work? We shall see". KDVR described this as "a possible warning". All anonymous edits to Wikipedia leave an IP address of the editor's computer, and according to an IP address lookup website, the location of the edit appears to be Littleton, Colorado, which is near where the shooting occurred, and no other edits to Wikipedia were made by that IP address. The comment was eventually deleted from the page.

Shooting
At 1:53 pm, 18-year-old Devon Erickson and 16-year-old Alec McKinney entered the school carrying handguns and other weapons hidden in guitar cases. They opened fire in two separate locations, shooting several students. The school proceeded to announce a lockdown, and the Douglas County Sheriff's Office issued a warning via Twitter to avoid the area, describing it as an "unstable situation". Police responded to the school two minutes after the first 911 call and a bomb disposal robot was brought to the school after tactical gear was found inside one of the suspects' vehicles. A direct two-way radio link from the school to Douglas County Sheriff's dispatch center is credited with the prompt response; the STEM School is one of only a few so equipped.

According to a student, Devon Erickson allegedly pulled out a gun and yelled, "nobody move". Kendrick Ray Castillo jumped on him and was fatally shot in the chest. Erickson was then subdued and disarmed by two other students. This occurred in the high school section of the school, while Alec McKinney targeted the middle school section and wounded four students before being tackled by an armed security guard.

McKinney had planned to commit suicide after the shooting, but "he didn't know how to work the safety [on a gun] and isn't familiar with guns". Instead, McKinney was ordered to the ground by a security guard and arrested. 

Officers did not have to fire at the suspects prior to them being taken into custody, later confirming that at least two handguns were used in the shooting, with three handguns and a rifle recovered. However, there was an instance of friendly fire during the response in which a private security guard reacted to a muzzle of a gun coming around the corner, that was later established to be held by a Douglas County Sheriffs deputy. Officers also went to Erickson's home and seized a car with hand-painted graffiti that read "Fuck society" as well as "666" and a pentagram.

Victims
One student was killed and eight others were injured in the shooting, two were in serious condition. On 12 May the last of wounded were released from the hospital. Officials told reporters at the time that the youngest victim was 15 years old. There were no staff deaths or injuries; all victims were students.

At least three students, 18-year-old seniors Kendrick Castillo, Joshua Jones, and Brendan Bialy, lunged at an attacker, later identified as Erickson.  The three students jumped from their desks and slammed the gunman against the wall.  The shooter fired off several shots as they struggled with him. Castillo was killed in the process, the only student killed during the shooting.  Jones was shot twice, receiving non-life-threatening injuries in his leg and hip. Bialy managed to wrestle the handgun away from the shooter during the struggle.

Perpetrators

The two suspects, who were students at the school, were taken into custody in two separate locations following the shooting. Local media outlets reported that the weapons used by the suspects were stolen from a parent, and that neither were known to law enforcement prior to the attack. Some media outlets made an effort to avoid reporting the suspect's identities, in an effort to take part in the #NoNotoriety campaign, which seeks to avoid rewarding the shooters with recognition.

One perpetrator, Devon Michael Erickson, was 18 at the time of the shooting. According to an interview with one of the STEM school students, on repeated occasions, Erickson made jokes about school shootings and had even gone as far as to tell those around him, "don't come to school."  On Snapchat, Erickson used the screen name 'devonkillz'. Erickson was booked on 30 criminal counts, which included one count of first degree murder and 29 counts of attempted first degree murder. He was held without bond pending his next court appearance.

The other perpetrator is Alec McKinney, a transgender boy. He was 16 at the time of the shooting.

On June 20, a statement was released that summarized police interviews with the two suspects. According to the statement, McKinney said he had been planning the attack for weeks, and Erickson said he learned about the attack the night before through Snapchat. Erickson said that McKinney threatened him and that he followed McKinney's plan because he feared for his life. McKinney said he planned to target two students in particular as they had bullied and ridiculed him due to his gender identity and called him "disgusting". McKinney said that "he wanted the kids at the school to experience bad things, have to suffer from the trauma like he has had to in his life." McKinney also stated he has heard voices and has suffered from homicidal and suicidal thoughts since the age of 12, and refused to take medication so that he "wouldn't feel alone". "The Voices Win" was found written in Devon Erickson's house prior to the shooting. Both suspects said they used cocaine before the shooting.

Legal proceedings
After the initial court appearance on May 8, Erickson and McKinney were formally criminally charged with the shooting at a May 15 court hearing in the Douglas County court. Each of the two suspects was charged with 48 criminal counts, including "first-degree murder after deliberation, arson and burglary". McKinney was charged as an adult, although his lawyers tried to move his case to the juvenile court; the judge denied the motion.

On June 14, it was announced that the judge appointed to oversee both of the suspects' cases had recused herself from the case of McKinney but stayed on to oversee the case of Erickson.

On January 2, 2020, Erickson pleaded not guilty to first degree murder and other charges. His trial began on May 31, 2021. His defense team claimed that Erickson was an accomplice who was forced to commit the shooting. One of his defense attorneys said that he was a "confused kid" and "not a monster".

On February 7, 2020, McKinney pleaded guilty to 17 charges in a plea bargain with the prosecution. On the first degree murder charge, he faced a minimum sentence of 40 years to life in prison, but could be eligible for release earlier than that if he enters a rehabilitation program and earns time off for good behavior. Due to his age he could not be given the death penalty or life without parole. He was sentenced to life with a chance of parole in 40 years on May 18.

On June 15, 2021, Devon Erickson was convicted on 46 counts, including first-degree murder, attempted first-degree murder, conspiracy to commit first-degree murder and supplying a juvenile with a handgun. On September 17, 2021, Erickson was sentenced to life in prison without parole, plus 1,282 years.

Response

President Donald Trump issued a statement on Twitter the day after the shooting, thanking first responders for "bravely intervening" and writing, "We are in close contact with law enforcement".

White House Deputy Press Secretary Judd Deere issued a statement: "Our prayers are with the victims, family members, and all those affected" by the shooting, as did Republican Senator Cory Gardner: "The safety and comfort of our schools should never be taken away". Democratic Representative Jason Crow said: "... we have a public health crisis on our hands ... It is not enough to send thoughts and prayers ... We must pass common-sense gun violence laws".

Vigils, rallies, and memorials
Community gatherings were held after the shooting, which included an interfaith memorial vigil , a community service and dinner, and other memorials. During the vigil, a protest broke out and many students were heard saying "mental health". A large portion of the students walked out of the event, which was organized by a local chapter of the Brady Campaign to Prevent Gun Violence. The walkout occurred after the students listened to speeches from members of the community and several politicians, who were perceived by the students to be more concerned with gun control than on the need to support the victims of the shooting.

One student wrote an opinion piece critical of the vigil, saying "many who attended this vigil desired to exploit our pain to support political agendas" and that there should have been more focus on "honoring Kendrick, 18, who rushed the shooter and was fatally shot". Another interviewed shortly after the vigil claimed, "I understand calling for gun control but like these were handguns — these aren't AR-15s these kids are carrying. There's a law in Colorado you can't buy a handgun unless you're 21 – like how can you prevent that?"

Two days after the shooting, a small local rally for increased school security was held.

See also

 List of mass shootings in the United States in 2019
 List of school-related attacks
 List of school shootings in the United States
 List of shootings in Colorado

References

2010s crimes in Colorado
2019 in Colorado
2019 mass shootings in the United States
Mass shootings in Colorado
Mass shootings in the United States
May 2019 crimes in the United States
May 2019 events in the United States
School killings in the United States
School shootings in the United States
Criminal duos
Transgender in the United States
Douglas County, Colorado
School bullying
Bullying in the United States
2019 active shooter incidents in the United States